The 1936 Denver Pioneers football team was an American football team that represented the University of Denver as a member of the Rocky Mountain Conference (RMC) during the 1936 college football season. In their first season under head coach Bill Saunders, the Pioneers compiled a 7–1–1 record (6–1–1 against conference opponents), finished second in the RMC, and outscored opponents by a total of 141 to 88.

Schedule

References

Denver
Denver Pioneers football seasons
Denver Pioneers football